V. Chandrakumar, better known by his stage name Sasi Kalinga, was an Indian actor who worked in Malayalam cinema. He acted in Paleri Manikyam: Oru Pathirakolapathakathinte Katha (2009), Pranchiyettan & the Saint (2010), Indian Rupee (2011), Adaminte Makan Abu (2011) and in Amen (2013).

Personal life
Sasi Kalinga received his primary education at St. Joseph's Boys' Higher Secondary School, and earned a diploma in automobile engineering from Kerala Government Polytechnic College, Kozhikode. He was married to Prabhavathi. They have two children—Amrutha Anoop and Aishwarya C. Kumar He died on 7 April 2020 in a private hospital in Kozhikode.

Filmography

References

External links
 All you want to know about #SasiKalinga
 
 

2020 deaths
Indian male film actors
Male actors from Kerala
People from Kozhikode district
Male actors in Malayalam cinema
21st-century Indian male actors
Year of birth missing